Karimugan is a 2018 Indian Tamil-language romantic comedy drama film written and directed by Chella Thangaiah. The film stars folk singer Senthil Ganesh and Gayatri Rema in the main lead roles. The plot of the film based on the teenage love and about a man Karimugan who hails from Pudukkottai comes to Chennai to solve his family dispute. The music for the film and the lyrics for the film were also penned by the director Chella Thangaiah. It was released on 25 October 2018 and received extremely negative reviews from critics.

Cast 
Senthil Ganesh
Gayatri Rema
Chella Thangaiah

Production 
The film project was announced by director Chella Thangaiah, who is well known as the music teacher of popular folk singer Senthil Ganesh. This was Senthil Ganesh's second film after Thirudu Pogatha Manasu (2014) and was also the second collaboration between Senthil Ganesh and Chella Thangaiah. Senthil was signed to play the lead role in the film as an electrician while being a contestant in the Super Singer 6. Newcomer Gayatri Rema made her film acting debut through this film who was originally based from Kerala and was roped into play the female lead opposite Senthil Ganesh in the film after being auditioned. The portions of the film were mostly shot and set in Pudukkottai.

References

External links

2018 films
2010s Tamil-language films
2018 romantic comedy-drama films
Indian romantic comedy-drama films